Malick Koly is a drummer, singer songwriter & producer best known for his works alongside Wallace Roney's Quintet.

Biography

Early life 
Koly grew up between three different continents, Africa, Europe And North America. He was born in Abidjan and is of Guinean and Malian decent. He began to study music at an early age through his mother the Malian vocalist and World Music Grammy award nominee Awa Sangho and his father Souleymane Koly the Franco-Guinean impresario and playwright.

Discography 

 WAF by Les Go de Koteba , released 2008
 Ala Ta by Awa Sangho, released 2014, motema music
 Jazz Traficantes by Le Deal, released 2020

References

External links 

 Official Website
 Malick Koly on Twitter
 Malick Koly on Instagram
 Malick Koly on Facebook

Ivorian musicians
French jazz drummers
African drummers
African composers
Living people
1998 births